Irfan-ul-Haque Siddiqui (pen name Irfan Siddiqui) is a Pakistani politician, senior journalist, columnist and analyst who is currently serving as a member of the Senate of Pakistan from the Punjab Province since March 2021. He belongs to Pakistan Muslim League (N). He also served as special adviser on national affairs to the former Prime Minister of Pakistan Nawaz Sharif.
During Nawaz Sharif's second reign Siddiqui has also served as the press secretary of the former President of Pakistan Rafiq Tarar.

Awards
 Hilal-e-Imtiaz (2014)

References

Pakistani journalists
Pakistani columnists
Recipients of Hilal-i-Imtiaz
Year of birth missing (living people)
Living people

Date of birth missing (living people)
Place of birth missing (living people)
Pakistani Senators 2021–2027
Pakistan Muslim League (N) politicians